Tanners Point is a rural settlement in the Western Bay of Plenty District and Bay of Plenty Region of New Zealand's North Island. It is on a headland on the eastern side of Tauranga Harbour, opposite Katikati Entrance.

A reserve and walkway preserve the coastal areas of the settlement.

The area, initially a Native reserve, was first called Frazer's Point and later Tanner's Point for local farmer Thomas Tanner who arrived in New Zealand in 1875. Both names were in use in the early 20th century.

Demographics
It is part of the wider Tahawai statistical area.

Tanners Point had a population of 201 at the 2018 New Zealand census, an increase of 30 people (17.5%) since the 2013 census, and a decrease of 15 people (−6.9%) since the 2006 census. There were 93 households, comprising 105 males and 96 females, giving a sex ratio of 1.09 males per female. The median age was 62.7 years (compared with 37.4 years nationally), with 12 people (6.0%) aged under 15 years, 12 (6.0%) aged 15 to 29, 90 (44.8%) aged 30 to 64, and 87 (43.3%) aged 65 or older.

Ethnicities were 94.0% European/Pākehā, 4.5% Māori, 1.5% Pacific peoples, and 3.0% Asian. People may identify with more than one ethnicity.

Although some people chose not to answer the census's question about religious affiliation, 49.3% had no religion, 34.3% were Christian, 1.5% were Hindu, 1.5% were Buddhist and 4.5% had other religions.

Of those at least 15 years old, 42 (22.2%) people had a bachelor's or higher degree, and 30 (15.9%) people had no formal qualifications. The median income was $31,600, compared with $31,800 nationally. 36 people (19.0%) earned over $70,000 compared to 17.2% nationally. The employment status of those at least 15 was that 60 (31.7%) people were employed full-time, 24 (12.7%) were part-time, and 6 (3.2%) were unemployed.

References

Western Bay of Plenty District
Populated places in the Bay of Plenty Region
Populated places around the Tauranga Harbour